Veda Advantage was the largest credit reference agency in Australia and New Zealand, before it was acquired by Equifax in February 2016.  It provided credit reporting, credit scoring, and marketing analytics services.

The Company was previously known as Baycorp Advantage, which was a merger of Australian company Data Advantage and New Zealand Company Baycorp in 2001. The name change was prompted by the sale of the Baycorp Collection Services which will retain the Baycorp name. The name change has already been applied to its listing on the Australian Stock Exchange. Veda controlled over 85% of the credit reference market in Australia, as at 2010, holding data on 14 million people.

References

External links
 

Financial services companies established in 1967
Financial services companies based in Sydney
Companies listed on the Australian Securities Exchange